An international student is a student who chooses to migrate to another country for education purposes. The United Kingdom is among the world's most popular destinations for international students. 

In 2019, the UK government set a target to recruit 600,000 international students in higher education by 2030. This was met one year later and in the 2021-22 academic year, there were 679,790 international students studying at UK higher education institutions (a 12.3% increase, 74,660, from the previous year). One annual cohort of international students is estimated to be worth £25.9 billion to the British economy.

Living Cost 
The UK ranks in the top 30 of the list of costly countries to live in the world. The costliest cities in the UK  in increasing order are London, Brighton, Reading, Cambridge, Bristol, Oxford, Edinburgh, Aberdeen, York and Manchester. The average rent per month in the UK for a one-bedroom is £655.42, which is significantly higher compared to other countries. 

 Hurdles: Students are liable to face challenges when they decide to study in a different country. Following are some of the challenges a student might face at the beginning of their stay, 
 Language: This is a pandemic, and in order to overcome this challenge, an international student is advised to find somebody who will translate for him this will help him understand what is being taught and he also will be in a better position to assimilate with others. Being proficient in the language before moving to a new country is always the smart choice. 
 Climatic changes: This may prove to be a significant challenge for any international student. Adapting between climatic conditions may be quite challenging in the beginning. Research is recommended in advance, which helps in packing the appropriate clothing and an extra layer of clothing is always recommended. 
 Cultural changes: Culture is not a prevalent concept, and it varies in every corner of the world, the customs that are important back home may not even be acceptable somewhere else. Students may go through an emotional turmoil due to this conflict; it advisable for them to accept the cultures and customs of their current place of residence. 
 Homesick: Moving away from home is bound to make one anxious and scared; this may lead to the feeling of being homesick. It is advisable to take the new changes with a stride and not focus on the fact that one is away from home.

Loan and Visa 
Majority students choose to study with the help of student loans, which consequently also helps them become independent. Students have admitted to over-draft being their primary source of income. Loans can be applied for back in the students home country, or they can choose to apply for a scholarship and apply for a loan as when needed. Getting a visa is given if a student is travelling to a different country for education. The visa a student needs to apply for is British Student Visa (Tier 4), 40 points are required to apply for it. These points can be earned by Course confirmation, Funding, Visa Application and Immigration Health Service Charge.

Accommodation 
Rent is the significant expenditure a student has to bear monthly. Majority universities provide accommodation to their students in the forms of dormitories. For those who wish not to or do not get a room allotted PBSAs are recommended as it provides a secure facility with student envisioned amenities.

Travel and Food 
The British citizens preferred mode of transport is either walking or public transport because of the expensive nature of the cab services. Students prefer walking or cycling to their place of work or studies. Eating out every day at a students budget  is not a quixotic decision. Students should learn to cook to save on the expenses.

Part-time jobs  
Students choose to either work part-time or full-time for various reasons. The number of students working has risen two percentage points in the last year. 45% out of 2,128 students have a part-time job, in which a third work during the term too.

Classification

By sending countries and regions
The top 15 countries and regions sending students to the United Kingdom in 2021/22 are listed below.

By number of International Students

The mainstream universities with the highest number of international students for 2021/22 are listed below:

By proportion of International Students

The mainstream universities with the highest proportion of international students for 2021/22 are listed below:

References 

Student migration